Coleophora impercepta is a moth of the family Coleophoridae.

References

impercepta
Moths described in 1997